is a Japanese football player currently playing for FC Machida Zelvia.

Career statistics
Updated to end of 2018 season.

National team career statistics

Appearances in major competitions

References

External links
Profile at Machida Zelvia

1988 births
Living people
Association football people from Tokyo Metropolis
People from Kodaira, Tokyo
Japanese footballers
J1 League players
J2 League players
J3 League players
FC Tokyo players
Mito HollyHock players
Giravanz Kitakyushu players
Avispa Fukuoka players
FC Machida Zelvia players
Association football midfielders